Anton Zef Grishi (born 9 January 1991 in Lezhë) is an Albanian professional footballer who plays for FC Sudsterne.

References

1991 births
Living people
People from Lezhë
Albanian footballers
Association football midfielders
Besëlidhja Lezhë players
KS Kastrioti players
KF Adriatiku Mamurrasi players
KF Tërbuni Pukë players
Kategoria Superiore players
Kategoria e Parë players